The Almazna coal mine is a large coal mine located in the south-east of Ukraine in Donetsk Oblast. Almazna represents one of the largest coal reserve in Ukraine having estimated reserves of 73.1 million tonnes of coal. The annual coal production is around 712,000 tonnes.

Almazna Mine State Open Joint Stock Company was formed in 1996 through the shareholding of RSCHA Mine. In 1997, the mine was renamed Almazna mine. The mine is a subsidiary of DHC "Dobropillyavugillya" and in fact remains a state-owned enterprise.

History 
In 1892, the mine started mining hard coal. In 1900, two artisanal mines were opened, named Yerastovo coal mines. In 1910, a joint-stock company was established. By 1930, the mine was producing 1300 tons of coal per day. In 1953, the town of Dobropillia was established on the basis of the mining villages.

Production dynamics 
Actual production in 2001 amounted to 2500–2700 tons per day. In 2003, 804 thousand tons of coal were mined. In 2014 — 585 thousand tons. In 2015 — 1 million tons.

See also 

 Coal in Ukraine
 List of mines in Ukraine

References 

Coal mines in Ukraine
Economy of Donetsk Oblast
Coal mines in the Soviet Union